Wu Guanghui (born 7 February 1960) is a Chinese engineer specializing in aircraft design, currently serving as deputy general manager of the Commercial Aircraft Corporation of China Ltd. He is an academician of the Chinese Academy of Engineering (CAE).

Biography 
Wu was born in Wuhan, Hubei, on 7 February 1960. During the Down to the Countryside Movement, he became a sent-down youth in Caidian District. In 1978, he was admitted to Nanjing University of Aeronautics and Astronautics, majoring in aircraft design.

After graduating in 1982, he was despatched to the 603rd Institute of Ministry of Aeronautics Industry, where he successively as a designer, deputy director, and director. In March 2008, he was promoted to deputy general manager of the Commercial Aircraft Corporation of China Ltd and chief designer of C919 passenger aircraft.

He was a representative of the 17th National Congress of the Communist Party of China. He was a member of the 11th and 12th National Committee of the Chinese People's Political Consultative Conference. He is a delegate to the 13th National People's Congress.

Honours and awards 
 2010 State Science and Technology Progress Award (Special Prize)
 2011 National Labor Medal
 2013 Feng Ru Aviation Technology Elite Award
 2015 Special Government Subsidy of the State Councial
 27 November 2017 Member of the Chinese Academy of Engineering (CAE)

References 

1960 births
Living people
People from Wuhan
Engineers from Hubei
Nanjing University of Aeronautics and Astronautics alumni
Members of the 11th Chinese People's Political Consultative Conference
Members of the 12th Chinese People's Political Consultative Conference
Delegates to the 13th National People's Congress
Members of the Chinese Academy of Engineering